Sanna Judith Frida Svarvadal (born 14 November 2001) is a Faroese footballer who plays as a defender for 1. deild kvinnur club Klaksvíkar Ítróttarfelag and the Faroe Islands women's national team.

Club career
Svarvadal has played for KÍ in the Faroe Islands.

International career
Svarvadal made her senior debut for the Faroe Islands on 3 September 2019. She capped during the UEFA Women's Euro 2022 qualifying.

References

External links

2001 births
Living people
Faroese women's footballers
Women's association football defenders
Faroe Islands women's international footballers
Faroe Islands women's youth international footballers
KÍ Klaksvík players